Upper Aragon in Common (AAeC) is a political party in Spain founded in March 2018. It was originally formed in 2015 as an electoral coalition by Podemos, Now in Common (AeC) and Equo in the province of Huesca ahead of the 2015 Spanish general election.

Electoral performance

Cortes Generales

References

Podemos (Spanish political party)
Political parties established in 2015
Political parties in Aragon
2015 establishments in Aragon
Socialist parties in Spain
Unidas Podemos